The Jaffa Subdistrict was  one of the subdistricts of Mandatory Palestine. It was located around the city of Jaffa. After the 1948 Arab-Israeli War, the district was converted almost in entirely to the Tel Aviv District in Israel.

Depopulated towns and villages 

 al-'Abbasiyya
 Abu Kishk
 Bayt Dajan
 Biyar 'Adas
 Fajja
 al-Haram
 Ijlil al-Qibliyya
 Ijlil al-Shamaliyya

 al-Jammasin al-Gharbi
 al-Jammasin al-Sharqi
 Jarisha
 Kafr 'Ana
 al-Khayriyya
 al-Mas'udiyya
 al-Mirr
 al-Muwaylih

 Rantiya
 al-Safiriyya
 Salama
 Saqiya
 al-Sawalima
 al-Shaykh Muwannis
 Yazur

Subdistricts of Mandatory Palestine